Rose Lavenia Bernadette Rounds Ganilau, born July 5, 1951 as  Lavenia Bernadette Rounds, is a Fijian writer, broadcaster, and politician, who served as Minister for Labour, Minister for Tourism, Industrial Relations, Productivity and Environment in the interim Cabinet of Commodore Frank Bainimarama, having been appointed on 9 January 2007. In previous political roles, she served in 2000 and 2001 in the Interim Government of Prime Minister Laisenia Qarase as Assistant Minister for Social Welfare, and from June to December 2006, she was Deputy Leader of the Opposition and Chairperson of the Public Accounts Committee of the House of Representatives, until the military coup of 5 December.

Long a political activist, Ganilau's causes included women's rights and human rights in general, and has served as President of Women Entrepreneurs Fiji..  She spent much of mid-to-late 2005 campaigning against the government's controversial Reconciliation, Tolerance, and Unity Bill, which proposes to establish a Commission with the power to compensate victims and pardon perpetrators of the Fiji coup of 2000.  On 13 July 2005, she described the bill as one that would encourage hatred and violence rather than tolerance and accommodation.

Ganilau is married to Ratu Jone Antonio Rabici Rabaraba Ganilau, the youngest son of Ratu Sir Penaia Ganilau, Fiji's first President (1987-1993), and have adopted his grand-niece Jordana Nicolai Adi Mei Vikatoria Kainona Ganilau, daughter of Adi Laisa Ganilau.  Her brother-in-law, Ratu Epeli Ganilau, was a well-known contemporary politician.

Ganilau contested and won the Suva City General Communal Constituency for the United Peoples Party (UPP) in the general election scheduled for 6–13 May, defeating Cabinet Minister Kenneth Zinck.  She was one of two UPP candidates returned in the election.  Upon accepting office in the interim government in January 2007, however, UPP leader Mick Beddoes, an opponent of the military coup and of the government formed by its leader, asked her to resign from the party.

In January 2008, Ganilau was "dropped" from the government during a Cabinet reshuffle.  In November 2008 she established the Green Party of Fiji.

References

1951 births
Ethnic minority members of the House of Representatives (Fiji)
Living people
Fijian people of British descent
Industry ministers of Fiji
Environment ministers of Fiji
Labour ministers of Fiji
Tourism ministers of Fiji
Fijian people of I-Taukei Fijian descent